Second City or The Second City may refer to:
 
 Second city of the United Kingdom
 Chicago, nicknamed the Second City
 The Second City, an improvisational comedy troupe initially based in Chicago
 Mercenary: The Second City, a 1986 expansion pack for the video game Mercenary
 "Second City", an episode of 2007 Canadian/American TV series The Dresden Files
 Second City derby, Association-football rivalry between Aston Villa and Birmingham City
 Secondcity, stage name of American-born British musician Rowan Harrington (born 1987)

See also 
 Second City Television, a Canadian television sketch comedy show that aired intermittently between 1976 and 1984
 Secondary city